This is a list of Armenian authors, arranged chronologically.

Classical
Classical Armenian is the literary language of Armenia written during the 5th to 18th centuries. 
5th century

 Mesrop Mashtots — theologian, inventor of the Armenian alphabet
 Movses Khorenatsi — historian
 Ghazar Parpetsi — historian 
 Faustus of Byzantium — historian
 Agathangelos — historian
 Yeghishe — historian
 Koryun — historian
 Yeznik of Kolb — theologian

6th century
 David Anhaght — philosopher, Neo-Platonist

7th century 
 Anania Shirakatsi — geographer
 Sebeos — author of treatise
 Hovhan Mamikonyan — author of treatise
 Movses Kagankatvatsi — historian, author of the book "History of the World from Aghvan"
 Davtak Kertogh — poet
 Komitas Aghtsetsi — author of religious poetry

8th century
 Sahakdukht — hymnographer and poet
 Khosrovidukht — hymnographer and poet
 Ghevond — historian, author of "History of the Caliphs"

9th century

 Tovma Artsruni — historian
 Esayi Abu-Muse — hymnographer

10th century
 Hovhanes Draskhanakertsi — historian
 Ukhtanes — historian
 Movses Kaghankatvatsi — historian
 Movses Daskhuranetsi — historian
 Anania Mokatsi — author of treatise

11th century

 Grigor Narekatsi — poet
 Stepanos Taronatsi — historian
 Aristakes Lastivertsi — historian
 Mateos Urhaetsi — historian
 Grigor Magistros — author

12th century 
 Samuel Anetsi — historian
 Arysdaghes — author
 Mkhitar Gosh — historian, author
 Khachatur of Taron — poet
 Nerses Lambronatsi — poet
 Nerses Shnorhali — poet

13th century 
 Kirakos Gandzaketsi — historian
 Stepanos Orbelyan — historian
 Smbat Sparapet — historian
 Vardan Areveltsi — historian, author
 Frik — poet
 Vardan Aigektsi — writer of fables
 Hovhannes Erznkatsi — poet
 Hayton / Hethum — historian
 Grigor Aknertsi — historian 

14th century 

 Grigor Tatevatsi — philosopher and theologian
 Nerses Balients — historian

15th century
 Tovma Metsopetsi — historian
 Hovhannes Tlkurantsi — poet 
 Mkrtich Naghash — poet 

16th century
 Nahapet Kuchak — poet

17th century 
 Martiros of Crimea — writer, poet, historian
 Arakel Davrijetsi — historian
 Naghash Hovnatan — poet
 Yovanisik Caretsi — writer

18th century 
 Sayat-Nova — poet
 Mikayel Chamchian — historian
 Abraham Yerevantsi — historian
 Abraham Kretatsi — historian
 Baghdasar Dpir — poet

Modern

Western Armenian
 Iskander Abcarius (1826–1885)
 Mkrtich Beshiktashlian (1828–1868)
 Yuhanna Abcarius (1832–1886)
 Mkrtich Achemian (1838–1917)
 Ghevont Alishan (1820–1901)
 Yervant Aghaton (1860–1935)
 Hagop Baronian (1843–1891)
 Nshan Beshiktashlian (1898–1972)
 Reteos Berberian (1848–1907)
 Mari Beyleryan (1877–1915)
 Smpad Piurad (1862–1915)
 Erukhan (1870–1915)
 Melkon Giurdjian (1859–1915)
 Hamastegh (1895–1966)
 Rober Haddeciyan (born 1926)
 Ardashes Harutunian (1873–1915)
 Hovhannes Hintliyan (1866–1955)
 Hovhannes Hisarian (1826–1917)
 Diran Kelekian (1862–1915)
 Zaruhi Kalemkaryan (1871–1971)
 Voskan Martikian (1867–1947)
 Vahan Malezian (1871–1966)
 Arpiar Arpiarian (1851–1908)
 Misak Metsarents (1886–1908)
 Hrand Nazariantz (1886–1962)
 Krikor Odian (1834–1887)
 Yervant Odian (1869–1926)
 Hagop Oshagan (1883–1948)
 Kegham Parseghian (1883–1915)
 Levon Pashalian (1868–1943)
 Ruben Sevak (1885–1915)
 Levon Shant (1869–1951)
 Siamanto (1878–1915)
 Harutiun Svadjian (1831–1874)
 Vahan Tekeyan (1878–1945)
 Teotig (1873–1928)
 Tovmas Terzian (1840–1909)
 Bedros Tourian (1851–1872)
 Karapet Utudjian (1803–1904)
 Hovhannes Vahanian (1832–1891)
 Daniel Varujan (1884–1915)
 Zabel Yesayan (1878–1943)
 Zahrad (1924–2007)
 Tlgadintsi (1860–1915)
 Armen Dorian (1892–1915)
 Rupen Zartarian (1874–1915)
 Yervant Gobelyan (1923–2010)

Diaspora
 Arshag Chobanian (1872–1954)
 Louise Aslanian (1906–1945)
 Shahan Shahnour (1903–1974)
 Missak Manouchian (1906–1944)
 Simon Simonian (1914–1986)
 Antranig Dzarugian (1913–1989)
 Vahe Vahian (1908–1998)
 Tovmas Terzian (1840–1909)
 Gostan Zarian (1885–1969)
 Nigoghos Sarafian (1905–1973)
 Harut Sassounian (born 1950)
 Zareh Vorpuni (1902–1980)
 Moushegh Ishkhan (1913–1990)
 Vahé Oshagan (1922–2000)
 Kevork Ajemian (1932–1998)
 Bedros Hadjian (1933–2012)
 Marie Rose Abousefian (born 1944)
 Krikor Beledian (born 1945)
 Varand (born 1954)
 Tatev Chakhian (born 1992)

Eastern Armenian
Tsarist era 
 Harutyun Alamdaryan (1795–1834)
 Khachatur Abovian (1809–1848)
 Gabriel Sundukian (1825–1912)
 Ghazaros Aghayan (1840–1911)
 Arakel Babakhanian (1860–1932)
 Muratsan (1854–1908)
 Mikael Nalbandian (1829–1866)
 Nar-Dos (1867–1933)
 Raphael Patkanian (1830–1892)
 Pertch Proshian (1837–1907)
 Raffi (1835–1888)
 Alexander Shirvanzade (1858–1935)
 Alexander Tsaturyan (1865–1917)
 Tserents (1822–1888)
 Hovhannes Tumanyan (1869–1923) 
 Vahan Terian (1885–1920)

Soviet era
 Gevorg Abajian (1920–2002)
 Vahram Alazan (1903–1966)
 Levon Ananyan (born 1946)
 Vakhtang Ananyan (1905–1980)
 Zhirayr Ananyan (1934–2004)
 Axel Bakunts (1899–1937)
 Zori Balayan (born 1935)
 Gurgen Boryan (1915–1971)
 Arpenik Charents (1932–2008)
 Yeghishe Charents (1897–1937)
 Khachik Dashtents (1910–1974)
 Razmik Davoyan (born 1940)
 Vahagn Davtyan (1922–1996)
 Derenik Demirchian (1877–1956)
 Henrik Edoyan (born 1940)
 Gevorg Emin (1918–1998)
 Zhora Harutyunyan (1928–2002)
 Artashes Kalantarian (1931–1991)
 Silva Kaputikyan (1919–2006)
 Hakob Karapents (1925–1994)
 Zorayr Khalapyan (1933–2008)
 Sero Khanzadyan (1916–1998)
 Avetik Isahakyan (1875–1957)
 Gurgen Mahari (1903–1969)
 Metakse (1926–2014)
 David Mouradian (born 1951)
 Vardges Petrosyan (1932–1994)
 Hamo Sahyan (1914–1993)
 Anahit Sahinyan (1917–2010)
 Ashot Sahratyan (1936–2015)
 Paruyr Sevak (1924–1971)
 Hovhannes Shiraz (1915–1984)
 Vano Siradeghyan (born 1946)
 Hmayak Siras (1902–1983)
 Vahan Totovents (1889–1937)
 Seda Vermisheva (1932–2020)
 Hovik Vardoumian (born 1940)
 Alvard Petrossyan (born 1946)
 Stepan Zoryan (1889–1967)
 Hrant Matevosyan (1935–2002)
 Ruben Hovsepyan (1939–2016)
 Hayrapet Hayrapetyan (1874–1962)
 Nairi Zarian (1900–1969)

Independence era
 Levon Khechoyan (1955–2014)
 Sipan Shiraz (1967–1997)
 Hovik Vardoumian (born 1940)
 Artem Harutyunyan (born 1945)
 Ruben Hakhverdyan (born 1950)
 Armen Shekoyan (1953–2021)
 Vahram Martirosyan (born 1959)
 Marine Petrossian (born 1960)
 Vahram Sahakian (born 1964)
 Anush Aslibekyan (born 1981)
 Aram Pachyan (born 1983)

See also
 Armenian literature

References

Poets
Armenian
Authors
Writers